Edwin Lacierda is a Filipino lawyer and technology entrepreneur. He is the co-founder of the online payments company, PayMongo. He was a member of the Philippine Cabinet and Presidential Spokesperson of President Benigno S. Aquino III. Prior to this, he was the spokesperson for the presidential campaign of then Senator Aquino from November 2009 up to the elections in May 2010.
 
Prior to joining the campaign, he was a law practitioner and a co-convener for the Black and White Movement, an organization of civil society groups calling for transparency and accountability in government. He served as the legal counsel of whistleblower of Rodolfo “Jun” Lozada during the Senate investigation on the NBN-ZTE controversy.

Lacierda was also part of the Optical Media Board from 2004 to 2007, representing the academe.

Apart from his involvement in civic and public service, Lacierda taught Constitutional Law at the Far Eastern University Institute of Law from 1992 to 2008 and at the Pamantasan ng Lungsod ng Maynila from 2007 to 2010.

Lacierda received his degree in AB Communication Arts from the De La Salle University in 1983, LLB from Ateneo Law School, at the Ateneo de Manila University, in 1989, and his Masters in Management degree from the Asian Institute of Management in 1991

References

Living people
Ateneo de Manila University alumni
Presidential spokespersons (Philippines)
Benigno Aquino III administration cabinet members
De La Salle University alumni
Asian Institute of Management alumni
Academic staff of Far Eastern University
20th-century Filipino lawyers
1962 births
Academic staff of Pamantasan ng Lungsod ng Maynila